Ajay Bijli is chairman of PVR Ltd and the owner of PVR Cinemas chain in India. Since 2013 Bijli has been a managing director for CineMAX India and a director for iPic Entertainment Inc.

Mr. Bijli is the board member of Mumbai Academy of the Moving Image.

Early life and education
Bijli completed his BCom from Hindu College of University of Delhi. After graduating, he joined his family’s transportation business and his father’s Priya Theater in Delhi.  Bijli’s father Krishan Mohan Bijli died in 1992 and in 1994 a big fire broke out in the warehouse of his transportation business. On the advice of his mother, Bijli wrote cheques to all of those whose goods were gutted in the fire. In 1995, a Hollywood producer introduced Bijli to an Australian production house “Village Roadshow” which expanded in India further and led to the start of PVR-Priya Village Roadshow.

Career
Bijli founded PVR in 1995 India’s first multiplex cinema at Saket (Delhi) after reconstructing the Anupam Cinema. After his Australian partner left Village Roadshow from Indian market, Bijili decided to  expand his business worth Rs. 100 crore. In 2012 Ajay became the managing director for the Karnataka-based Cinemax and also taking over DT cinemas in the year 2016. In 2017, the American cinema player iPic Entertainment appointed Bijli on a board position, from which he resigned in July, 2018.

Awards and recognition
 ‘International Exhibitor of the Year‘ at CineAsia Awards 2017, Hong Kong.
 ‘Asia Innovator of the Year’ at India Business Leader awards by CNBC TV18 in 2016.
 ‘Business Icon of the Year’ at International Film Business Awards by Indywood Film Market and ALIIFF.
 ‘Most Admired Multiplex Professional of the year‘ in CMO Asia’s Multiplex Excellence Awards.

References

Indian businesspeople
Indian company founders
Year of birth missing (living people)
Living people